Tianyoude Hotel Cycling Team is a Chinese UCI Continental cycling team established in 2009.

Team roster

Major wins
2017
Overall Tour of Qinghai Lake, Yonathan Monsalve
Stage 1 Vuelta Ciclista a Venezuela, Yonathan Monsalve
Stage 5 Tour de Singkarak, Yonathan Monsalve
2018
Stage 10 Vuelta al Táchira, Yonathan Monsalve
2019
Stage 4 Vuelta al Táchira, Yonathan Monsalve
2021
Stage 3 Tour of Qinghai Lake, Wang Jiancai
Stage 6 Tour of Qinghai Lake, Li Zisen
Stage 7 Tour of Qinghai Lake, Yuan Zhanhui
Stage 8 Tour of Qinghai Lake, Li Zisen
Overall Tour of Qinghai Lake, Zhang Zhishan

References

External links

UCI Continental Teams (Asia)
Cycling teams established in 2010
Cycling teams based in China